A head shot or headshot is a modern (usually digital) portrait in which the focus is on the person. The term is applied usually for professional profile images on social media, images used on online dating profiles, the 'about us page' of a corporate website, and promotional pictures of actors, models, and authors.

Entertainment industry
In theater, film, and television, actors, models, singers, and other entertainers are often required to include a head shot, along with their résumé, when applying for a job. Those head shots are intended for helping them land a career, an actor headshot should help casting directors understand the person exactly as he or she is (i.e., age group & ethnic background), while the actor hopes that the headshot will inspire the casting director to hire him or her. Head shots often feature the actor or actress facing off-center. A performer will often have head shots expressing different poses and expressions to give a potential employer an idea of the subject's range of appearances or expressions. These types of head shots are called "looks". It is common for an actor to have different head shots for different roles, but for the most part these consist of a change in attire. The head shots that include a person's shoulders are called "three-quarter" shots. Previously, head shots were often in black-and-white; however, most head shots are now taken in color.

Actors' head shots, when they are printed and not simply uploaded online to an industry database, are done in an 8"×10" format. Other promotional images, for example, press shots and lobby prints, may be in many different aspect ratios. Acting head shots are often not photographic prints, instead they are typically printed via a lithographic or laser process.

The main purpose of an actor's head shot is identification. Therefore, the most important feature of an actor's head shot is that it represents the subject. Theatrical head shots are usually very "neutral" looking shots of the actor and clearly show their facial features.

Head shots are intended to show a person as they currently appear and reflect their best qualities. Therefore, if an actor's hair has been recently cut or colored, they would often get a new head shot to reflect their new image. Additionally, if an actor has a scar or facial blemish, it is expected to be visible on the head shot and not digitally removed from the image. Pimples or spots are temporary and, therefore, are usually digitally retouched.

Modeling industry

Modeling head shots or comp cards, sometimes also called tear sheets, are a compilation of images for casting in one sheet with a résumé of work, name and relevant statistics. They are often done in color; however, in some jurisdictions, such as the UK, they may be in black-and-white. Models often use them for castings and modeling work applications. A close-up head shot is often required to show a model's skin complexion for beauty work.

Modeling head shots are usually used for:
 Comp cards or tear sheets
 Modeling portfolios
 TV advertisements for skin products
 Magazine advertisements for creams and other skin or hair products
 Online industry profiles

Models' head shots are also often professionally retouched to ensure their close-up beauty photograph appears perfect without blemishes or spots.

Comp cards are one of the cornerstones of a model's “marketing materials”. They are about 5½×8” and printed on both sides. Almost all 
comp cards are in color but may include black-and-white images. A model may have four to five images on the comp card and at least one of these images will be a head shot.

See also
Close-up, for use in film-making
Mug shot
Photography

References

Photographic techniques

Stage terminology